Henrik Mustonen (born 6 November 1990 in Hollola) is a professional squash player from Finland. He reached a career-high world ranking of World No. 35 in February 2014.

References

External links 
 
 

1990 births
Living people
Finnish male squash players